Straight is a 2007 German film by the director Nicolas Flessa.

Plot
The young German-Polish Jana does everything possible to give the impression of a straight acting woman. Her good-looking, bourgeois friend David and her pretence of working for a newspaper are attempts to hide her inner conflicts and her true occupation as a social worker in the low-prestige Berlin district of Neukoelln.

But there is the young German Turk Nazim, who also tries hard to keep up the appearance of straightness. Night after night he goes out with his friends, dances with girls like Jana and deals with drugs on Hermann Square. Neither his best friend Akin nor his playmates are suspicious.

Since his nocturnal encounter with a young German man on Sonnenallee it has become more difficult for him to keep up the façade of normal life. This is the beginning of a love triangle that is dangerous for the self-understanding of all parties, because Nazim's new lover is no one else but Janas boy friend David.

Cast

Festivals
 Verzaubert Film Festival (Munich/Berlin/Frankfurt/Berlin, Germany)
 Pink Apple Festival (Zurich, Switzerland)
 New York LGBT Film Festivals (New York City, USA)
 Philadelphia International Gay & Lesbian Film Festival (Philadelphia, USA)
 Perlen Filmfestival (Hannover, Germany)
 Reeling Festival (Chicago, USA)
 Outview Festival (Athens, Greece)
 Chéries-Chéris Festival (Paris, France)

Music
In addition to the soundtrack by Boris Bojadhziev, the Berlin Band Kitty Solaris contributed some songs to the film:
 "Songs In The Radio" (from the album Smells Like Summer, 2004)
 "Changing Card"s (from the album Future Air Hostess, 2007)
 "Permanent Vacation" (from the album Different People Recording, 2003)

External links
 
 http://www.straight-derfilm.de/
 http://www.pinkapple.ch/2008/php/detail.php?id=167&ort=zuerich

2007 films
2007 drama films
2000s German-language films
German LGBT-related films
LGBT-related drama films
2007 LGBT-related films
2000s German films